"Babushka Boi" is a song by American rapper ASAP Rocky, released as a single through ASAP Rocky Recordings, Polo Grounds Music and RCA Records on August 28, 2019. The music video was released the same day.

Background
ASAP Rocky began wearing a babushka to cover the resulting cut on his face after he fell off his scooter in September 2018. This inspired Frank Ocean, who posted a picture on his Instagram of himself in a babushka, with ASAP Rocky commenting "Babushka Boi" on the image and later adding the phrase to his own Instagram. Rocky previewed the song at the 'Injured Generation Tour' in January 2019, and shared a trailer of its music video on August 26.

Music video
The Nadia Lee Cohen-directed music video was also released on August 28. It was inspired by Dick Tracy and features ASAP Rocky, ASAP Ferg, Schoolboy Q, ASAP Nast and Kamil Abbas as prosthetic-enhanced gangsters robbing a bank and on the run from police, who are portrayed as anthropomorphic pigs. The criminals get into a shootout with the police which "leaves ASAP and his crew with some fresh sausage meat."

It has been noted that it was filmed before ASAP Rocky's arrest and detainment in Sweden. The video was produced by Virgin Soil Pictures.

Charts

Weekly charts

Certifications

References

2019 singles
2019 songs
ASAP Rocky songs
Songs written by ASAP Rocky
Songs written by Boys Noize
RCA Records singles